Mary U. Farquharson (née Nichols; April 5, 1901 - September 1, 1982) was an American politician who served as a member of the Washington State Senate from 1935 to 1943.  She represented Washington's 46th legislative district as a Democrat.

Early life and education
Farquharson was born Mary U. Nichols in 1901 in Tacoma, Washington. In 1928, she married Frederick "Burt" Farquharson, a civil engineer and University of Washington engineering professor.

She was originally a member of the Socialist Party. She and Burt founded the Washington Commonwealth Federation, a political pressure group founded in 1934 that functioned as an organized faction of the Washington State Democratic Party and came to be dominated by the Communist Party USA by the late 1930s. WCF dissolved in 1948, during the Second Red Scare.

Political career
Mary and Burt became active in liberal politics in 1930; both were active in the Fellowship of Reconciliation, an interfaith peach and justice organization.

In 1934, with encouragement from the Women's Legislative Council of Washington, she ran for and won a seat in the Washington State Senate, serving two terms from 1935 to 1943.  Although she ran as a Democrat, she was previously a Socialist.  Her first Senate campaign prominently featured Upton Sinclair's slogan "Production for use not for profit," embodying a central economic tenet for both evolutionary socialists and revolutionary Marxists in the movements' 19th-century origins.

In 1935, the year she joined the Legislature, she was also one of the founders of the ACLU's Seattle chapter.

With large Democratic majorities in both houses of the Legislature, Farquharson was able to have an immediate legislative impact even in her first term. She advanced a bill limiting working hours for domestic workers to 60 per week, bringing Eleanor Roosevelt to Seattle in support.  Her legislative priorities also included seeking a progressive state income tax, funding education, advocating a unicameral legislature, and repealing Washington's criminal syndicalism law.

In 1939, she helped secure commutation of the sentence of Ray Becker, the last Industrial Workers of the World member incarcerated in relation to the Centralia Massacre, who had maintained his innocence for the intervening 20 years.

Opposition to internment of Japanese Americans
During World War II, she worked to help incarcerated Japanese Americans during their internment by the United States government.  After the arrest of Gordon Hirabayashi for his open defiance of internment, Farquharson suggested that he make his case a test case, organized a support committee for Hirabayashi, and served as its secretary-treasurer as the committee raised funds for his legal defense.  This support was important in advancing Hirabayashi's case all the way to decision by the U.S. Supreme Court, particularly as the ACLU refused to support Hirabayashi.

More broadly, her advocacy against mass internment included working in 1943 as one organizers of the Pacific Coast Committee on American Principles and Fair Play.

After the Legislature
In 1950, Farquharson ran once more for the state Senate, but lost in the primary.  She and Burt remained politically active after the War, opposing capital punishment and nuclear proliferation until Burt's death in 1970.

Death and legacy
When Farquharson died in 1982, twelve years after her husband, she left 90% of her estate to the Fellowship of Reconciliation.

Affiliations
 Fellowship of Reconciliation
 Northwest Regional Secretary before and during World War II
 Seattle Urban League
 Women's International League for Peace and Freedom
 Delegate to 1946 Luxembourg Congress
 Women's Legislative Council
 University of Washington YMCA (board member)

Further reading
Sources cited in her biography from the Washington Legislature:
 “Seattle 1921-1940, From Boom to Bust”, Berner
 “Women of Washington,” Compiled by the American Association of University Women
 “Political Pioneers, The Lawmakers,” by Kathryn Hinsch
 “Democratic Women’s Activities in Washington,” The Washington State Democrat, published by the Women's Legislative Council of Washington, November, 1941.
 “Mary U. Farquharson papers, 1875-1982,” University of Washington, Special Collections.
 Ray Moore: An Oral History, interviewed by Sharon Boswell, Washington State Oral History Program, Office of the Secretary of State, 1999
Oral history interview, photos, and memorabilia on Washington State Digital Archives.
Mary Farquharson Papers, 1931-1981: Overview of the Collection, Archives West guide to collection in University of Washington Libraries special collections. 
Frederick Burt Farquharson Papers, 1923-1961: Overview of the Collection, Archives West guide to collection in University of Washington Libraries special collections. 
Additional sources cited in her biography on Densho Encyclopedia:
 Hirabayashi, Gordon, et al. A Principled Stand: The Story of Hirabayashi v. United States . Seattle: University of Washington Press, 2013.
 Irons, Peter. Justice at War: The Story of the Japanese American Internment Cases . New York: Oxford University Press, 1983. Berkeley: University of California Press, 1993.
 Scott, George W. "Mary Farquharson." Columbia: The Magazine of Northwest History 21.3 (Fall 2007): 17–21.

References

1901 births
1982 deaths
Democratic Party Washington (state) state senators
Women state legislators in Washington (state)